Vinyl acetate is an organic compound with the formula CH3CO2CH=CH2. This colorless liquid is the precursor to polyvinyl acetate and ethene-vinyl acetate copolymers, important industrial polymers.

Production
The worldwide production capacity of vinyl acetate was estimated at 6,969,000 tonnes/year in 2007, with most capacity concentrated in the United States (1,585,000 all in Texas), China (1,261,000), Japan (725,000) and Taiwan (650,000). The average list price for 2008 was US$1600/tonne. Celanese is the largest producer (ca 25% of the worldwide capacity), while other significant producers include China Petrochemical Corporation (7%), Chang Chun Group (6%), and LyondellBasell (5%).

It is a key ingredient in furniture glue.

Preparation
Vinyl acetate is the acetate ester of vinyl alcohol. Since vinyl alcohol is highly unstable (with respect to acetaldehyde), the preparation of vinyl acetate is more complex than the synthesis of other acetate esters.  

The major industrial route involves the reaction of ethylene and acetic acid with oxygen in the presence of a palladium catalyst.

 2 C2H4 + 2 CH3CO2H + O2 -> 2 CH3CO2CHCH2 + 2 H2O

This method has replaced the addition of acetic acid to acetylene. The main side reaction is the combustion of organic precursors.

Mechanism
Isotope labeling and kinetics experiments suggest that the mechanism involves PdCH2CH2OAc-containing intermediates. Beta-hydride elimination would generate vinyl acetate and a palladium hydride, which would be oxidized to give hydroxide.

Alternative routes
Vinyl acetate was once mainly prepared by hydroesterification, i.e., the addition of acetic acid to acetylene in the presence of metal catalysts. Using mercury(II) catalysts, vinyl acetate was first prepared by Fritz Klatte in 1912. Presently, zinc acetate is used as the catalyst:

Approximately 1/3 of the world's production relies on this route, which, because it is environmentally messy, is mainly practiced in countries with relaxed environmental regulations, such as China.

Another route to vinyl acetate involves thermal decomposition of ethylidene diacetate:

Polymerization
It can be polymerized to give polyvinyl acetate (PVAc). With other monomers it can be used to prepare various copolymers such as ethylene-vinyl acetate (EVA), vinyl acetate-acrylic acid (VA/AA), polyvinyl chloride acetate (PVCA), and polyvinylpyrrolidone (Vp/Va copolymer, used in hair gels). Due to the instability of the radical, attempts to control the polymerization by most "living/controlled" radical processes have proved problematic. However, RAFT (or more specifically, MADIX) polymerization offers a convenient method of controlling the synthesis of PVA by the addition of a xanthate or a dithiocarbamate chain transfer agent.

Other reactions
Vinyl acetate is useful in organic synthesis. Transacetylation is used to obtain enantioenriched alcohols and esters.  Iridium-catalyzed transacetylation have also been demonstrated:
 ROH + CH2=CHOAc → ROCH=CH2 + HOAc
Transvinylation is also possible using vinyl acetate.  It undergoes Diels-Alder reactions with dienes.

Vinyl acetate undergoes many of the reactions anticipated for an alkene and an ester. Bromine adds to give the dibromide. Hydrogen halides add to give 1-haloethyl acetates, which cannot be generated by other methods because of the non-availability of the corresponding halo-alcohols. Acetic acid adds in the presence of palladium catalysts to give ethylidene diacetate, CH3CH(OAc)2. It undergoes transesterification with a variety of carboxylic acids. The alkene also undergoes Diels–Alder and 2+2 cycloadditions.

Toxicity evaluation
Tests suggest that vinyl acetate has low toxicity. Oral  for rats is 2920 mg/kg.

On January 31, 2009, the Government of Canada's final assessment concluded that exposure to vinyl acetate is not harmful to human health. This decision under the Canadian Environmental Protection Act (CEPA) was based on new information received during the public comment period, as well as more recent information from the risk assessment conducted by the European Union.

In the context of large-scale release into the environment, it is classified as an extremely hazardous substance in the United States as defined in Section 302 of the U.S. Emergency Planning and Community Right-to-Know Act, under which it "does not meet toxicity criteria[,] but because of its acute lethality, high production volume [or] known risk is considered a chemical of concern". By this law, it is subject to strict reporting requirements by facilities that produce, store, or use it in quantities greater than 1000 pounds.

See also
Polyvinyl alcohol
Vinyl propionate

References

External links
 EPA health assessment information on vinyl acetate
 CDC - NIOSH Pocket Guide to Chemical Hazards
 Summary of risk assessment by the Government of Canada

Hazardous air pollutants
Monomers
IARC Group 2B carcinogens
Acetate esters
Commodity chemicals
Vinyl esters